Bradley Jay Slagh is a Republican member of the Michigan House of Representatives.

Biography 
Before being elected to the state legislature, Slagh worked in the finance industry. Slagh worked for both First Michigan Bank, and then for Byron Center State Bank. Slagh was elected to the   Michigan Association of County Treasurers and served as the president in 2016.

Election history

References

External links 
 Bradley Slagh at gophouse.org
 Bradley Slagh at ballotpedia.org
 Bradley Slagh at votesmart.org

Living people
Hope College alumni
Republican Party members of the Michigan House of Representatives
21st-century American politicians
Year of birth missing (living people)